Elliston is an incorporated fishing settlement situated on the Bonavista Peninsula of Newfoundland, Canada. Incorporated in 1965, the town of Elliston was once called Bird Island Cove and it is composed of a number of communities, North Side, Noder Cover, Elliston Centre, Elliston Point, Porter's Point, Sandy Cove, The Neck and Maberly. Elliston is known as the Root Cellar Capital of the World and has claimed that title from the 135 root cellars that exist in the community.

Elliston was renamed from Bird Island Cove by Reverend Charles Lench to honour the first Methodist Missionary, Reverend William Ellis, to this community. The name Bird Island Cove was used since the early 17th century and it gets its name from two small islands, North and South Bird Island, that lie off the south entrance of this cove.

In 2013, parts of the movie The Grand Seduction were filmed at Elliston.

Demographics 

See also 
 List of cities and towns in Newfoundland and Labrador
 List of people of Newfoundland and Labrador

References 

https://www.townofelliston.ca/1about/inquire.html

https://www.townofelliston.ca/2visit/loop.html#ptrain

External links 
 
 Town of Elliston
 James Ryan Heritage House
Elliston - Encyclopedia of Newfoundland and Labrador, vol.1, p. 772-774.

Populated coastal places in Canada
Towns in Newfoundland and Labrador